Tralee Bay is located in on the west coast of County Kerry, Ireland. It is situated between Kerry Head on the north side and the Maharees on the west and  extends eastwards as far as the bridge at Blennerville.  Several small rivers feed into the bay through the town of Tralee.  Villages around the bay include; Ballyheigue, Fenit, Kilfinora, Spa, Blennerville, Camp and Castlegregory.

General information
The hinterland of Tralee Bay is rich in historic content covering most major eras in the origins and development of the Island and the Nation, from the mythological history, social and industrial development to relatively recent political evolution. In conjunction with Barrow Harbour, the following list of people, items, places and events are indicative and relevant;

Scotia's Grave
 Cathair Cun Ri
 Ring Forts or Raths
 Sou Terrains
 Spa
 Blennerville
Blennerville Windmill
Saint Brendan
Tralee Ship Canal
Spanish Armada
Ardfert Cathedral
Roger Casement
Jeanie Johnston
Civil War
Aud
 Bee Hive Huts
Fenit Harbour
Irish Lights
RNLI
Maharee Islands
Dingle Peninsula
 Liebherr Container Cranes
 Oyster Beds
 Bird Sanctuary
 Fenit Viaduct
 Fenit Railway Station and Branch Line

Maps and charts
Ordnance Survey of Ireland, Discovery Series Map ref No. 71 Kerry.  Scale 1:50,000
British Admiralty Navigation Chart Ref No. 2739. Scale = 1:37,500.

Place names and features
Generally, clockwise from Kerry Head;
Kerry Head
Ballyheigue Pier
Ballyheigue
Blackrock
Banna Strand
 Illaunnabarnagh (rock)
 Mucklaghmore rock
 Illaunnacusha, rock
Crow Rock
 The Rose rock
 Barrow Golf Links
Fenit Island
Barrow Harbour
 Little Samphire Island
 Samphire Lighthouse
 Wheel Rock
Black Rock
Spa
 Tralee Ship Canal
River Lee from Tralee
 Blennerville Bridge
Blennerville Windmill
 Blennerville
 Bealathaleen Creek
 Derrymore Island
 Derrymore Strand
 Carrigagharor Point
 Aughacasla Strand
Castlegregory
Lough Gill
 The Trench River
 Kilshshannig point
 Illaunlea rock
 Callahangrin headland
Rough Point
 Mucklaghbeg rock
 Minnaun Point
 Illaunturlogh island
 Illauntannig island
 Reennafardarrig island
 Illaunboe island
 Illaunimmil island
 Inishtooskert island
Magharee Islands or The Seven Hogs
 The Maharees
Scraggane Bay
 Minnaun
 Illaunnanoon
 Doonagaun Island

Items of interest
A bird sanctuary is located on the south side of the bay on the low-lying land of Derrymore Island.
Little Samphire is a low-lying rock in the Bay on which a lighthouse stands. The lighthouse, operated and maintained by the Commissioners of Irish Lights also marks the limit of the harbour area under the control of Tralee and Fenit Harbour Board.
Great Samphire Island is a small rock in the Bay around which is built the harbour and port of Fenit.  The name comes from the rather rare yellow samphire plant that grows there. A monument to Saint Brendan the Navigator is located at the apex.
Tralee Golf Club overlooks the whole bay from an elevated position at Barrow.
Tralee Bay Sailing Club and a Sailing School, along with Fenit Marina provide leisure boating facilities.
Shore based angling is a popular pastime practised from the viaduct leading out to the harbour.
Several angling boats are licensed to take recreational anglers out on the bay.
Tralee Bay Sea Angling Club, the largest sea angling club in Ireland, has its clubhouse in Fenit Harbour.

Vessels sunk and wrecked

Integrity 13/3/1837. Lost off Brandon Head, en route from Tarbert to the Clyde.
Audrey Anne 5/12/1998. 65 foot trawler lost off Brandon Head
Brothers 4/5/1841. A Dingle hooker carrying potatoes for the Protestant colony at Dingle
Saint Lawrence 7/2/1840. A barque went ashore at Ballyheigue Bay.
Port Yarrock 29/1/1894. Sank in Brandon Bay, en route from Santa Rosilia, California. All 22 crew lost.
See also "http://www.irishwrecksonline.net/Lists/KerryListB.htm" for much more detailed information.

Adjacent bays
Brandon Bay is the next bay to the south west and the Shannon Estuary is located to the north. Barrow Harbour is a bay located in the bay, east of Fenit Island.

References

Bibliography
 Discovering Kerry, T.J. Barrington, 1976, Blackwater, Dublin 
 Shipwrecks of the Irish Coast, Vol 3. by Edward J Bourke.
 A Gallant Barque, by Sheila Mulcahy, Published and Printed by The Kerryman, 1999. ISBN o 946277 25 7 P

Bays of County Kerry
Tralee
Ramsar sites in the Republic of Ireland